Alice White (born Alva White; August 25, 1904 – February 19, 1983) was an American film actress. Her career spanned late silent films and early sound films.

Early years
Alice White was raised by her maternal grandparents in Paterson, New Jersey, and she attended schools in Paterson and East Orange, New Jersey. Her grandfather owned a fruit business.

Film

After leaving school, White became a secretary and "script girl" for director Josef von Sternberg. She also worked as a switchboard operator at the Hollywood Writers' Club. After clashing with von Sternberg, White left to work for Charlie Chaplin, who decided before long to place her in front of the camera. 

Her bubbly and vivacious persona led to comparisons with Clara Bow, but White's career was slow to progress. In his book Silent Films, 1877-1996: A Critical Guide to 646 Movies, Robert K. Klepper wrote: "Some critics have said that Ms. White was a second-string Clara Bow. In actuality, Ms. White had her own type of charm, and was a delightful actress in her own, unique way. Whereas Clara Bow played the quintessential, flaming redheaded flapper, Alice White was more of a bubbly, vivacious blonde."

After playing a succession of flappers and gold diggers, she attracted the attention of director and producer Mervyn LeRoy, who saw potential in her. Her screen debut was in The Sea Tiger (1927). Her early films included Show Girl (1928), which had Vitaphone musical accompaniment but no dialog, and its musical sequel Show Girl in Hollywood (1930), both released by Warner Brothers and both based on novels by J.P. McEvoy. In these two films, White appeared as Dixie Dugan. In October 1929, McAvoy started the comic strip Dixie Dugan with the character Dixie having a "helmet" hairstyle and appearance similar to actress Louise Brooks. White also used the services of Hollywood 'beauty sculptor' Sylvia of Hollywood to stay in shape.

White was featured in The Girl from Woolworth's (1929), having the role of a singing clerk in the music department of a Woolworth's store. Karen Plunkett-Powell wrote in her book Remembering Woolworth's: A Nostalgic History of the World's Most Famous Five-and-Dime: "First National Pictures produced this 60-minute musical as a showcase for up-and-coming actress Alice White."

Later career
White left films in 1931 to improve her acting abilities, returning in 1933 only to have her career hurt by a scandal that erupted over her involvement with boyfriend actor Jack Warburton and future husband Sy Bartlett. Although she later married Bartlett, her reputation was tarnished and she appeared only in supporting roles after this, including Jimmy the Gent (1934) with James Cagney and Bette Davis. By 1937 and 1938, her name was at the bottom of the cast lists. She made her final film appearance in Flamingo Road (1949) and eventually resumed working as a secretary.

Personal life

In 1933, White and her fiancé, American screenwriter Sidney "Sy" Bartlett, were accused of arranging the beating of British actor John Warburton. White and Warburton had reportedly had a love affair that ended when he beat her so badly she required cosmetic surgery. A grand jury in Los Angeles decided not to charge Bartlett or White; however, the bad publicity hurt White’s career. 

White married Bartlett on December 3, 1933, in Magdalena, Mexico. She filed for divorce in 1937, claiming he "stayed away from home" and was awarded $65 per week in alimony.

White remarried, to film writer John Roberts, on August 24, 1940. They divorced on April 18, 1949, in Los Angeles. The following year, she sued him over unpaid alimony.

Death
White died of complications from a stroke on February 19, 1983, at age 78. She was buried at Valhalla Memorial Park Cemetery in North Hollywood.

Award
White has a star at 1511 Vine Street in the Motion Pictures section of the Hollywood Walk of Fame. It was dedicated on February 8, 1960.

Filmography

References

External links

 Alice White singing and dancing in a clip from Show Girl in Hollywood (from YouTube).
 James Cagney slaps Alice White in a clip from Picture Snatcher (from YouTube)
 
 
 
 Alice White Photos & Biography
 Photographs and literature

1904 births
1983 deaths
American film actresses
American silent film actresses
Actors from Paterson, New Jersey
Roanoke College alumni
Actresses from New Jersey
20th-century American actresses